Justo Lorente Collado (born 27 February 1984) is a Nicaraguan footballer who plays for Juventus Managua.

References

External links
 

1984 births
Living people
Nicaraguan men's footballers
Nicaragua international footballers
People from Masaya
Nicaraguan expatriate footballers
Expatriate footballers in Costa Rica
Nicaraguan expatriate sportspeople in Costa Rica
Liga FPD players
Real Estelí F.C. players
Municipal Liberia footballers
UNAN Managua players
Managua F.C. players
Juventus Managua players
Association football goalkeepers
2013 Copa Centroamericana players
2014 Copa Centroamericana players
2017 Copa Centroamericana players
2017 CONCACAF Gold Cup players
2019 CONCACAF Gold Cup players